The Blytheville Greyhound Bus Station is located at 109 North 5th Street in Blytheville, Arkansas.  It is a single-story island-type station in the Streamline Moderne architectural style, with rounded corners, and projecting canopies on either side.  The main entrance also has a rounded canopy over it, and a vertical sign rising above, advertising the Greyhound Bus Lines.  This station was built by the company in around 1937, when it was undergoing a major expansion campaign.  The building is one of the finest examples of Art Moderne styling in the state. The station was designed by architects William Nowland Van Powell and Ben Watson White.

The station was listed on the National Register of Historic Places in 1987.  The station ceased bus operations in 2001 and fell into disrepair. In 2004 the station was purchased for preservation and restoration. Since 2010, it has served as an office, museum, and visitor's center for Main Street Blytheville.

See also
Blytheville Commercial Historic District
National Register of Historic Places listings in Mississippi County, Arkansas

External links 
 Main Street Blytheville (Owner-operator of the preserved building)

References

Transportation buildings and structures on the National Register of Historic Places in Arkansas
Streamline Moderne architecture in the United States
Commercial buildings completed in 1937
Transportation in Mississippi County, Arkansas
Greyhound Lines
National Register of Historic Places in Mississippi County, Arkansas
Bus stations on the National Register of Historic Places
Blytheville, Arkansas
1937 establishments in Arkansas